The India national cricket team toured the Pakistan during the 1984–85 cricket season. They played three Test matches against the Pakistan cricket team; the series was drawn 0–0. The Third Test was cancelled because of the assassination of Indira Gandhi on 31 October 1984.

Test matches

1st Test

2nd Test

3rd Test

One Day Internationals (ODIs)

Pakistan won the Wills Series 1-0 by winning the first match. The second match was abandoned following the assassination of Indira Gandhi and the third cancelled when the tour was called off.

1st ODI

2nd ODI

3rd ODI

References

External links
 Cricarchive
 Tour page CricInfo
 Record CricInfo

1984 in Indian cricket
1984 in Pakistani cricket
1984-85
International cricket competitions from 1980–81 to 1985
Pakistani cricket seasons from 1970–71 to 1999–2000